Barasht-e Bala (also Romanized as Barāsht-e Bālā) is a village in Fatuyeh Rural District, in the Central District of Bastak County, Hormozgan Province, Iran. At the 2006 census, its existence was noted, but its population was not reported.

References 

3.	الكوخردى ، محمد ، بن يوسف، (كُوخِرد حَاضِرَة اِسلامِيةَ عَلي ضِفافِ نَهر مِهران) الطبعة الثالثة ،دبى: سنة 199۷ للميلاد Mohammed Kookherdi (1997) Kookherd, an Islamic civil at Mehran river,  third edition: Dubai
4.	محمدیان، کوخری، محمد ، “ (به یاد کوخرد) “، ج1. ج2. چاپ اول، دبی: سال انتشار 2003 میلادی Mohammed Kookherdi Mohammadyan (2003), Beyade Kookherd, third edition : Dubai.
5.محمدیان، کوخردی ، محمد ،  «شهرستان بستک و بخش کوخرد»  ، ج۱. چاپ اول، دبی: سال انتشار ۲۰۰۵ میلادی Mohammed Kookherdi Mohammadyan (2005), Shahrestan  Bastak & Bakhshe Kookherd, First edition : Dubai.
6.عباسی ، قلی، مصطفی،  «بستک وجهانگیریه»، چاپ اول، تهران : ناشر: شرکت انتشارات جهان
7.   سلامى، بستكى، احمد.  (بستک در گذرگاه تاریخ)  ج2 چاپ اول، 1372 خورشيدى
8. اطلس گیتاشناسی استان‌های ایران [Atlas Gitashenasi Ostanhai Iran] (Gitashenasi Province Atlas of Iran)

Populated places in Bastak County